Thanasis Moulopoulos (born 9 June 1985) is a Greek footballer. He plays as a defender, currently for Aris Limassol, in the Cypriot First Division.

Career
Born in Veria, Moulopoulos began playing football for Ethnikos Asteras F.C. in the Beta Ethniki.

References

External links
Profile at epae.org
Guardian Football
Profile at Insports.gr

1985 births
Living people
Greek footballers
Greek expatriate footballers
Super League Greece players
Football League (Greece) players
Cypriot First Division players
Ethnikos Asteras F.C. players
Levadiakos F.C. players
Athlitiki Enosi Larissa F.C. players
Aris Limassol FC players
Association football fullbacks
Footballers from Veria